Waterfront may refer to:

Waterfront (area), the dockland district of a town

Music
Waterfront (band), a 1980s British pop duo
Waterfront Records, an Australian record label
"Waterfront" (song), a 1983 song by Simple Minds
Waterfront Blues Festival, in Portland, Oregon
 Waterfront (album)

Film and television
Waterfront (1928 film), directed by William A. Seiter
Waterfront (1939 film) a Warner Brothers film directed by Terry O. Morse
Waterfront (1944 film), starring John Carradine
Waterfront (1950 film), directed by Michael Anderson, starring Richard Burton and Robert Newton
Waterfront (1955 TV series), a 1955 television series starring Preston Foster
Waterfront (miniseries), a 1984 Australian miniseries

Places
Camden Waterfront, the docklands district of Camden, New Jersey, U.S.
Waterfront, Swansea, a community and electoral ward in Swansea, Wales
Quad Cities Waterfront Convention Center, located in Bettendorf, Iowa, USA
Victoria & Alfred Waterfront, a historic harbour in Cape Town, South Africa
Dubai Waterfront, a massive offshore community being built in Dubai, United Arab Emirates
The Waterfront, Hong Kong, a private housing estate
The Waterfront, an open-air shopping center in Homestead, Pennsylvania, just outside Pittsburgh
The Waterfront Barrow-in-Furness, a large port redevelopment project in Barrow-in-Furness, England
Waterfront Hall, a concert hall and exhibition centre in Belfast, Northern Ireland
The Waterfront, Norwich, a music venue in Norwich, Norfolk
Waterfront, New Jersey (disambiguation), various places
WaterFront Center, a non-profit center for marine education in Oyster Bay, New York
Waterfront Place, Brisbane, a large office tower in Brisbane, Australia
Waterfront Park (Seattle), a public park on the Central Waterfront, Downtown, Seattle, Washington, USA
Waterfront Trail, a series of trails along the shore of Lake Ontario, Canada
Waterfront Station (Singapore)
Waterfront station (Vancouver), a ferry terminal and train station in Vancouver, Canada
Waterfront station (Washington Metro), a Washington Metro station
Waterfront City (disambiguation), various places
Stockholm Waterfront, an office building in Stockholm, Sweden
Chatham Waterfront bus station, a bus station located in Chatham, UK
Beau Rivage, a waterfront themed casino located in Biloxi,Mississippi

Other uses
Waterfront Shipping, a Norwegian company operating tankers
Waterfront Commission of New York Harbor
Waterfront Historic Area League
Waterfront Workers History Project
 Waterfront (novel), a 1934 novel by John Brophy

See also
Dock (maritime)
Docklands (disambiguation)